Markhamia is a genus of flowering plants in the family Bignoniaceae. The genus is named after Clements Markham.

Species
 Markhamia lutea (Benth.) K.Schum.	
 Markhamia obtusifolia (Baker) Sprague	
 Markhamia stipulata (Wall.) Seem.	
 Markhamia tomentosa (Benth.) K.Schum. ex Engl.	
 Markhamia zanzibarica (Bojer ex DC.) K.Schum.

References

External links

Markhamia zanzibarica (Bojer ex DC.) K.Schum.

 
Bignoniaceae genera
Taxa named by Henri Ernest Baillon
Taxa named by Berthold Carl Seemann